Robert Marks may refer to:
 
 Robert Marks (management), professor at Australian Graduate School of Management
 Robert J. Marks II (born 1950), professor of engineering at Baylor University
 Robert Marks (vocal coach), American vocal coach

See also
Robert Mark (disambiguation)
Robert Marx (disambiguation)
Marks (surname)